Callimation venustum is a species of beetle in the family Cerambycidae. It was described by Félix Édouard Guérin-Méneville in 1844. It is known from Madagascar. It contains the variety Callimation venustum var. obscurum.

References

Tragocephalini
Beetles described in 1844